The Thailand national kabaddi team represents Thailand in international kabaddi.

Tournament records

Asian Games

Men's team

Women's team

World Cup

Asian Beach Games

Asian Indoor Games

See also
 Sport in Thailand

External links
 Official Website
 World Cup 2004 results
 World Cup 2007 Results

Kabaddi
National kabaddi teams
National kabaddi team